Akçapınar can refer to the following villages in Turkey:

 Akçapınar, Bozüyük
 Akçapınar, Çanakkale
 Akçapınar, Devrekani
 Akçapınar, Gönen
 Akçapınar, Keles
 Akçapınar, Kızıltepe
 Akçapınar, Mustafakemalpaşa
 Akçapınar, Osmaneli
 Akçapınar, Serik
 Akçapınar, Yenişehir